2018–19 Malaysia Purple League (also known as SS Purple League for sponsorship reasons) is the fifth edition of Malaysia Purple League. It started on 21 December 2018 and will conclude on 27 January 2019. It will consist of 28 league ties (each tie consisting of 5 matches) in Stage 1. Top two teams in Stage 1, progressed to the finals stage. Meanwhile the rest to the Stage 2 (divided into 2 groups) to accumulates points to contest four remaining spots for finals stage. Finals stage will features six teams.

Squads

Stage 1

Standings

Fixtures

Round-robin

Stage 2

Overall standings

Fixtures

Finals stage

Players transfer

Bracket

Final standings

References

External links
 Tournament Link

Malaysia Purple League
Malaysia Purple League
Malaysia Purple League
Malaysia Purple League
Badminton tournaments in Malaysia